Eudaphaenura is a genus of moths of the family Noctuidae.  The species of this genus are found in Madagascar.

Species
Eudaphaenura catalai (Viette, 1954)
Eudaphaenura griveaudi 	(Viette, 1961)
Eudaphaenura splendens (Viette, 1954)

References
Natural History Museum Lepidoptera genus database

Specific

Cuculliinae
Noctuoidea genera